Hir Jamus Saghir  is a Syrian village located in Salqin Nahiyah in Harem District, Idlib.  According to the Syria Central Bureau of Statistics (CBS), Hir Jamus Saghir had a population of 432 in the 2004 census.

References 

Populated places in Harem District